The Preis der Europäischen Kirchenmusik is a German music prize awarded annually since 1999 by the Schwäbisch Gmünd Festival Europäische Kirchenmusik. Awards are given to excellent composers and artists for achievements in the field of sacred music. The prize is endowed with €5,000.

Winners

1999: Dieter Schnebel
2000: Peter Schreier
2001: Petr Eben
2002: Eric Ericson
2003: Krzysztof Penderecki
2004: Frieder Bernius
2005: Arvo Pärt
2006: Daniel Roth
2007: Klaus Huber
2008: Helmuth Rilling
2009: Sofia Gubaidulina
2010: Marcus Creed
2011: Hans Zender
2012: Clytus Gottwald
2013: Sir John Tavener
2014: Thomanerchor Leipzig
2015: Younghi Pagh-Paan
2016: Hans-Christoph Rademann
2017: Wolfgang Rihm
2018: 
2019: John Rutter
2020–2021: Joshua Rifkin
2022: Peteris Vasks
2023 Ludger Lohmann

References

German music awards
Awards established in 1999
Church music
1999 establishments in Germany
1999 in music